Bertram Clifford "Bert" Morrison (January 10, 1880 – April 23, 1969) was a Canadian professional ice hockey rover who was active with several clubs in the early 1900s. Amongst the teams Morrison played for were the Pittsburgh Keystones, Portage Lakes Hockey Club, Calumet Miners, Montreal Shamrocks, Toronto Professionals, Montreal Wanderers and Haileybury Hockey Club.

Career
Morrison started out on the semi-professional ice hockey circuit in the 1901–02 season when he played for the Pittsburgh Keystones in the Western Pennsylvania Hockey League. Amongst his teammates on the Keystones that season were Riley Hern and Harry Peel, with Peel later admitting to being paid money to play for the team. Morrison himself were investigated on the same matter by the Ontario Rugby Football Union and the Ontario Hockey Association after playing a game with Toronto against London.

In the 1903–04 season Morrison scored a total amount of 94 goals in 25 games with the Portage Lakes Hockey Club, playing alongside future Hockey Hall of Fame members Hod Stuart, Bruce Stuart, Riley Hern and Jack Gibson.

Statistics
Exh. = Exhibition games, NYSHL = New York Senior Hockey League

Statistics per Society for International Hockey Research at sihrhockey.org

References
The Origins and Development of the International Hockey League and its effect on the Sport of Professional Ice Hockey in North America Daniel Scott Mason, University of British Columbia, 1992

Notes

1880 births
1969 deaths
Canadian ice hockey players
Pittsburgh Keystones (ice hockey) players
Portage Lakes Hockey Club players
Montreal Shamrocks players
Calumet Miners players
Montreal Wanderers players
Haileybury Comets players
Ice hockey people from Toronto